Racker is a surname. Notable people with the surname include:

Efraim Racker (1913–1991), Austrian biochemist
Heinrich Racker (1910–1961), Polish-Argentine psychoanalyst

See also
Raker (surname)
Rucker (surname)